Ľudovítová is a small village and municipality in the Nitra District in western central Slovakia, in the Nitra Region.

History
In historical records the village was first mentioned in 1389.

Geography
The village lies at an elevation of 152 metres and covers an area of 1.878 km². It has a population of about 255 people.

References

External links
 
Statistics page for municipalities in Slovakia

Villages and municipalities in Nitra District